CT40 may refer to:

Bob Kingsley's Country Top 40, a radio show hosted by Bob Kingsley from 2006
Casey's Top 40, a 1990s radio show hosted by Casey Kasem
CT40, a 40mm cannon developed by CTA International
CT 40, Connecticut Route 40